Phillip Perry "Sparky" Woods (born December 20, 1953) is an American football coach.  He is a senior adviser for football team at the University of North Carolina at Chapel Hill. Woods served as the head football coach at Appalachian State University from 1984 to 1988, the University of South Carolina from 1989 to 1993, and the Virginia Military Institute (VMI), from 2008 to 2014.

Playing career
Woods attended Oneida High School, where he is in its Hall of Fame. He holds the record for the most interceptions in a season. He played quarterback and defensive back at Carson–Newman College before graduating in 1976.

Coaching career
Woods was named the 30th head coach at VMI on February 13, 2008.  Before arriving at VMI, Woods had over 30 years of college and professional coaching experience.

When coaching at South Carolina, a song about Woods entitled "Sparky Rock" was released on cassette tape.

On November 24, 2014, it was announced by VMI that Woods' contract would not be renewed by Athletic Director Dave Diles. The announcement came less than a day after a 45–25 loss to arch rival The Citadel, ending a 2–10 season for the Keydets. In seven seasons, Woods compiled a 17–62 record at VMI, including a mark of 9–32 in conference play.

On February 20, 2015, he was named running backs coach, recruiting coordinator, and associate head coach, at the University of Richmond.

In 2019, Woods joined Mack Brown's staff at the University of North Carolina at Chapel Hill as a senior adviser to Brown.

Head coaching record

Personal life
Woods and his wife, Jean Ann, have two children, a daughter, Emily, and a son, Casey who is on the SMU football staff.

References

1953 births
Living people
Alabama Crimson Tide football coaches
Appalachian State Mountaineers football coaches
Carson–Newman Eagles football players
Iowa State Cyclones football coaches
Kansas Jayhawks football coaches
Memphis Tigers football coaches
Mississippi State Bulldogs football coaches
New York Jets coaches
North Alabama Lions football coaches
North Carolina Tar Heels football coaches
Richmond Spiders football coaches
South Carolina Gamecocks football coaches
Tennessee Volunteers football coaches
Virginia Cavaliers football coaches
VMI Keydets football coaches
People from Scott County, Tennessee